La caza. Monteperdido is a Spanish crime thriller limited television series starring Megan Montaner, Francis Lorenzo and Alain Hernández. A self-contained story, the plot concerns the disappearance of two girls in the Aragonese Pyrenees and the ensuing investigation carried out five years later by UCO agents as one of the girls appears. Produced by RTVE in collaboration with DLO Producciones, it aired on La 1 from March to May 2019. It spawned a sequel/second season, La caza. Tramuntana.

Premise 
Two girls, Ana (Carla Díaz) and Lucía (Ester Expósito), disappear in the Pyrenees in the province of Huesca. Five years later Ana appears. Santiago Baín (Francis Lorenzo) and Sara Campos (Megan Montaner), two Central Operative Unit (UCO) agents arriving from Madrid, take over the investigation on Ana's disappearance and Lucía's whereabouts, partnering with a local officer, Víctor Gamero (Alain Hernández).

Cast

Production and release 

Consisting of an adaptation of the novel Monteperdido by Agustín Martínez, the series was created by Martínez himself together with Luis Moya and produced by RTVE in collaboration with DLO Producciones. Filming took place in the Aragonese Pyrenees and was wrapped up by December 2018. Shooting locations included Benasque, Cerler, Sesué, Sahún, the Llanos del Hospital ski resort, the Remuñe gorge and the Ésera river.

The first episode premiered in prime time on 25 March 2019. The weekly broadcasting run ended on 20 May 2019. Averaging a 14.0% audience share, it was one of the most successful free-to-air Spanish series in 2019.

A new installment concerning a wholly unrelated crime case and characters (in a sort of anthology series) was reportedly the original plan to continue the series if it was successful, but the sequel/second season (La caza. Tramuntana), while indeed set in a new location, eventually came to feature the reprisal of the roles of Sara Campos (Megan Montaner) and Víctor Gamero (Alain Hernández), thus connecting both fictions.

Awards and nominations 

|-
| rowspan = "9" align = "center" | 2019 || FesTVal Vitoria-Gasteiz || colspan = "2" | FesTVal Award ||  || 
|-
| rowspan = "4" | 21st Iris Awards || Best Actor || Alain Hernández ||  || rowspan = "4" | 
|-
| Best Actress || Megan Montaner || 
|-
| colspan = "2" | Best Fiction || 
|-
| Best Production || Production team of La caza. Monteperdido || 
|-
| Prix Europa Awards || colspan = "2" | Best TV Fiction ||  || 
|-
| Venice TV Awards || colspan = "2" | Best Series ||  || 
|-
| rowspan = "2" | 7th  || Best Drama Actress || Megan Montaner ||  || rowspan = "2" | 
|-
| Best Drama Actor || Alain Hernández || 
|-
| align = "center" | 2020 ||  || colspan = "2" | Audience Award for the Spanish selection ||  || 
|}

References 

2010s Spanish drama television series
2019 Spanish television series debuts
2019 Spanish television series endings
La 1 (Spanish TV channel) network series
Spanish crime television series
Spanish mystery television series
Spanish-language television shows
Television series based on Spanish novels
Television series by DLO Producciones
Television shows filmed in Spain
Television shows set in Aragon